Spravedlnost (English: Absolution) is Czech crime television series. It tells story of police investigator Richard who investigates murder of prominent judge that was committed by his daughter Lily. The first episode premiered on 12 March 2017. It was directed by Peter Bebjak. Vetchý who starrs in the series collaborated with Bebjak on Případy 1. oddělení.

Spravedlnost received Czech Lion Award for the best television film or miniseries of 2017.

Plot
Richard is a police investigator who hasn't seen his daughter Lily for very long time. The series starts when Lily shows up at his door and asks for help. She tells him that she fell in love with judge Kowalský but he attacked her and she killed him in self-defense. He decides to help her at all cost. Richard becomes lead investigator in case of Kowalský's murder.

Cast
Ondřej Vetchý as Richard Koller, the series protagonist. He is a chief investigator whose team gets a case of murder committed by his daughter. He tries to save her even at cost of his career.
Martin Finger as Tomáš Lohnický, Richard's colleague who ivestigates murder committed by Lily and who suspects Richard.
Elizaveta Maximová as Lily Kollerová, Richard's daughter who committed a murder.
Jan Plouhar as Matěj Pospíšil
Jitka Schneiderová as Monika Lohnická
Kristýna Boková as Pospíšilová
Lukáš Vaculík as Miroslav Dostál
Aleš Bílík as Vojta Hájek
Ondřej Malý as Radek Hrdlíř, a journalist
Veronika Jeníková as Ludmila Dostálová
Lenka Krobotová as Kamila Kowalská
Dušan Urban as a taxi driver Roman
Štěpán Kozub as Marek

Production
The series was shot during Spring 2016. It started before Eastern 2016 in Ostrava. Other sooting places included Prague or Skuhrov.

Episodes

Reception
The series competed for audience with Temný kraj by TV Prima and with the third series of the entertainment show Tvoje tvář má známý hlas by TV Nova. Each episode gathered around 700,000 viewers the age over 15, which was also the limit of audience accessibility of the show.

According to the reviewer of Aktuálně.cz, Martin Svoboda, the overall miniseries is "more successful than its problematic first part". He gave her a rating of 65%. According to him, it is also worthy of praise that, in contrast to the richness of motifs that are common elsewhere, "[in] Justice, one and the same motif appears repeatedly, only the backdrops differ. Thanks to this, creators can go deeper and uncover new corners of a single idea.”

The series won the 2017 Czech Lion Award in the "Best Television Film or Miniseries" category.

Remake
Entertainment One Television Production acquired rights to produce remake of the mini series.

References 

Czech crime television series
2017 Czech television series debuts
Czech television films
Czech Television original programming
Czech Lion Awards winners (television series)
Czech television miniseries